This is a list of members of the House of Assembly of Papua and New Guinea from 1968 to 1972. The House of Assembly had 94 members, increased from 64 in the previous House. There were 69 open electorates, 15 regional electorates and ten official members. The reserved seats for non-indigenous members in the first House were not retained.

At the beginning of the new House, 18 MPs had publicly identified themselves as belonging to political parties: Pangu Party had thirteen (Cecil Abel, Paul Lapun, Pita Lus, John Guise, Mangobing Kakun, Michael Kaniniba, Siwi Kurondo, Paliau Maloat, James Meangarrum, Donatus Mola, Ebia Olewale, Michael Somare and Tony Voutas), the United Democratic Party had two (Yakob Talis and Beibi Yembanda), the All People's Party had two (Dennis Buchanan and James McKinnon), while the Agricultural Reform Party had one (Epineri Titimur).

Notes

References

List
Papua New Guinea politics-related lists